The Seidelmann 30-T is an American sailboat that was designed by Bob Seidelmann as a cruiser and first built in 1977.

The Seidelmann 30-T is a development of the Seidelmann 30, with a "T" shaped cockpit.

Production
The design was built by Seidelmann Yachts in the United States, starting in 1977, but it is now out of production.

Design
The Seidelmann 30-T is a recreational keelboat, built predominantly of fiberglass, with wood trim. It has a masthead sloop rig; a raked stem; a raised counter, reverse transom; an internally mounted spade-type rudder controlled by a wheel and a fixed fin keel or optional shoal draft keel. It displaces  and carries  of ballast.

The design has sleeping accommodation for five people, with a double "V"-berth in the bow cabin, a double fold-out straight settee berth in the main cabin and an aft cabin with a quarter berth on the port side. The galley is located on the starboard side just forward of the companionway ladder. The galley is equipped with a two-burner stove, an icebox and a sink. The head is located just aft of the bow cabin on the both sides and includes a sink.

See also
List of sailing boat types

References

Keelboats
1970s sailboat type designs
Sailing yachts
Sailboat type designs by Bob Seidelmann
Sailboat types built by Seidelmann Yachts